"What Am I Crying For" is a song by American band Dennis Yost and The Classics IV. It was released as a single in 1972 from the album of the same title.

The song was the band's final Top 40 hit on the Billboard Hot 100, peaking at No. 39. It was also their second and final Top 10 hit on the Adult Contemporary chart, peaking at No. 7.

Chart performance

References

1972 singles
1972 songs
Classics IV songs
MGM Records singles
Songs written by Buddy Buie
Songs written by J. R. Cobb